Téva is a French general-interest television channel, privately owned, with a female and family focus, belonging to the M6 Group. Téva has been broadcast in 16:9 since 10 November 2009 and in HD quality since 8 November 2011.

History
In April 1995, Laurence Aupetit was appointed as Project Development Director for the new thematic channel, which was then called Vivre. Following differences of opinion, she resigned and was replaced by Mike Le Bas. Téva is a mini generalist digital television channel available on cable, satellite, and ADSL in France. The core target is the housewife under the age of 50. Since its inception, it has been aimed at an essentially female audience with children. It is the first channel to have chosen this positioning. It was created on 6 October 1996 and is one of the channels wholly owned by the M6 Group. Today, this channel is one of the 15 most widely broadcast digital channels.

On 14 November 2010, Teva broadcast the first episodes of the Cougar Town series, which made the best launch for a series broadcast on its airwaves.

Téva celebrated its 15th anniversary in 2011. To celebrate this anniversary the channel offered special evenings from 15 to 29 June 2011. Téva modified its on-air look on 2 March 2014.

The channel achieves record audiences with the series Drop Dead Diva, Devious Maids, Gran Hotel and The Good Wife. The successful programs remain Teva Déco or Magnifique by Cristina.

Since November 2016, the channel has also been accessible via the 6play site and application (iOs and Android), where one can find the channel's programmes live and as replay.

References

External links
 

Television stations in France
Television channels and stations established in 1996
1996 establishments in France
Mass media in Paris